Annie Elizabeth Kunz (born February 16, 1993) is an American track and field athlete who specializes in heptathlon. She represented United States of America at the Tokyo Olympics, 2019 World Athletics Championships, 2019 Pan American Games and two Thorpe Cups competing in women's heptathlon. She also played soccer in college for Texas A&M.

Professional career
Kunz has qualified to represent the United States at the 2020 Summer Olympics.

NCAA
Kunz earned 9 All-Conference honors and NCAA Division 1 All-American honors in 2016 and 2013 at NCAA Division I Women's Outdoor Track and Field Championships.

Prep

Kunz is a graduate of Wheat Ridge High School in Wheat Ridge, Colorado and 10-time Colorado High School Activities Association State medalist in track and field, earning six gold and four silver medals.

Kunz won four CHSAA 4A State titles as a senior in 100 hurdles 14.09 seconds, 300 hurdles in 43.30 seconds, high jump  and triple jump .

In 2010 as a junior, Kunz placed second at CHSAA 4A State championship in 100 hurdles 14.51 seconds, 300 hurdles 45.45 seconds and high jump .

Kunz won two CHSAA 4A State titles as a sophomore in 2009 in 100 hurdles 14.37 seconds in windy conditions and high jump  while finishing second in triple jump .

Personal life
Kunz currently resides in San Clemente, California. She is also the daughter of Super Bowl winner Terry Kunz. She also has two siblings, Kelli and Terry.

References

External links
 
 
 
 
 
 
 Annie Kunz soccer profile at Texas A&M Aggies
 Annie Kunz track and field profile at Texas A&M Aggies

American heptathletes
1993 births
Living people
World Athletics Championships athletes for the United States
USA Indoor Track and Field Championships winners
Pan American Games medalists in athletics (track and field)
Pan American Games silver medalists for the United States
Athletes (track and field) at the 2019 Pan American Games
Medalists at the 2019 Pan American Games
USA Outdoor Track and Field Championships winners
People from Wheat Ridge, Colorado
Texas A&M Aggies women's track and field athletes
American female hurdlers
American female high jumpers
Athletes (track and field) at the 2020 Summer Olympics
Olympic track and field athletes of the United States
American women's soccer players
Soccer players from Colorado
Women's association football forwards
Texas A&M Aggies women's soccer players